Hermann Møller Boye (5 July 1913 – 12 June 1944) was a member of the Danish resistance executed by the German occupying power.

Biography 

Boye was born 5 July 1913 in Marstal to shipmaster Herman Møller Boye and wife Maren née Rasmussen and baptized Herman Møller Boye in Marstal's church on the ninth Sunday after Trinity the same year.

In 1935 Boye graduated as a teacher from Nørre Nissum Seminarium and from that year he was a teacher until 1944.

On June 12, 1944 Boye was executed in Ryvangen by the Gestapo.

After his death 

After the liberation Boye's remains were exhumed at Ryvangen and transferred to the Department of Forensic Medicine of the university of Copenhagen.

On 29 August 1945 Boye and 105 other victims of the occupation were given a state funeral in the memorial park founded at the execution and burial site in Ryvangen where his remains had been recovered. Bishop Hans Fuglsang-Damgaard led the service with participation from the royal family, the government and representatives of the resistance movement.

A memorial plaque at Nørre Nissum Seminarium where he graduated as a teacher commemorates his sacrifice for Denmark.

References

External links

1913 births
1944 deaths
People from Ærø Municipality
Danish schoolteachers
Danish resistance members
Danish people executed by Nazi Germany
Danish people of World War II
Resistance members killed by Nazi Germany